The  is a type of monorail train which has operated on the Osaka Monorail since 2001. The trains are built by Hitachi, Ltd. and Kawasaki Heavy Industries, have aluminium bodies, and operate as four-car formations.

Build details

Interior

Special liveries

Electric multiple units of Japan
Alweg people movers rolling stock
Train-related introductions in 2001

1500 V DC multiple units of Japan
Kawasaki multiple units
Hitachi multiple units